Elmin Kurbegović (born 3 June 1987) is a Swedish footballer of Bosnian descent, who currently plays for IFK Värnamo.

Career
Kurbegović was born in Kotor Varoš in Bosnia and Herzegovina. After the war broke out he left for Sweden and started his career at Elfsborg in 2006. He left Elfsborg after the 2011 season, having not been offered a new contract by the club.

After just having played once in 2009 Allsvenskan he left for Novara on loan.

He was called up to play internationally for Sweden U21 in a friendly match. He's still eligible to represent both Sweden and Bosnia and Herzegovina at the senior level.

References

External links
 Profile at Football.it 
 at Novara  
 
 

1987 births
Living people
People from Kotor Varoš
Bosnia and Herzegovina emigrants to Sweden
Swedish people of Bosnia and Herzegovina descent
Swedish footballers
Association football midfielders
Allsvenskan players
IF Elfsborg players
Novara F.C. players
IFK Värnamo players
Sweden under-21 international footballers
Swedish expatriate footballers
Expatriate footballers in Italy
Swedish expatriate sportspeople in Italy